Khao piak sen is a rice noodle soup that is a part of traditional Lao cuisine. It is a common comfort food that's great for a cold day. It is the "chicken noodle soup" of Laotian cuisine and does not require too many ingredients, but makes a perfect dish with its simplicity. It is often made in large batches to eat with a large group of people. It is sometimes prepared using pork belly. Chopsticks are commonly used to consume the soup, and it is commonly eaten as a breakfast dish.

Recipe

Broth 
The broth for Khao piak sen is usually made from pork, chicken or both. The broth is simmered with galangal, lemongrass, and kaffir lime leaves. In addition, some also simmer the broth with garlic cooked in oil.

Noodles 
The noodles in Khao piak sen are chewy fresh noodles that add a lot of starch to the overall dish. The noodles are made of rice flour, tapioca starch, and water. The noodles cook directly in the broth, releasing starches that give khao piak sen its distinct consistency. When served, the noodle soup is garnished with shredded chicken, sliced green onions, chopped cilantro, cabbage, fried garlic, fried shallots, lime, fried garlic chili and/or fish sauce. Bean sprouts are sometimes added.

See also

 List of soups
 Rice noodles

References

Laotian soups